Stephen A. Douglas (1813–1861) was an American politician.

Stephen or Steven Douglas may also refer to:
Stephen Douglas (journalist), British journalist
Stephen Douglass (1921–2011), American actor

See also
Steve Douglas (disambiguation)